Grete or Grethe is a feminine given name, a derivate of Margaret. It is most often used in Scandinavia (not including Sweden), Estonia, and German-speaking Europe.

People

Given name

First name
Grete Berget (1954–2017), Norwegian politician
Grete Daut (born 2000), Estonian footballer
Grete Eliassen (born 1986), Norwegian/American freeskier
Grete Faremo (born 1955), Norwegian politician
Grete Frederiksen (born 1918), Danish freestyle swimmer
Grete Frische (1911–1962), Danish actress, screenwriter and director
Grete Gaim (born 1993), Estonian biathlete
Grete Heckscher (1901–1987), Danish fencer
Grete Hermann (1901–1984), German mathematician and philosopher
Grete Kirkeberg (born 1964), Norwegian long-distance runner
Grete Knudsen (born 1940), Norwegian politician
Grete Kuld (born 1989), Estonian singer, actress and television presenter
Grete Mogensen, Danish badminton player
Grete Nordrå (1924–2012), Norwegian actress
Grete Ingeborg Nykkelmo (born 1961), Norwegian biathlete and cross country skier
Grete Olsen (1912–2010), Danish fencer
Grete Paia (born 1995), Estonian singer
Grete Püvi (born 1982), Estonian dressage rider
Grete Reinwald (1902–1983), German actress
Grete Rikko (1908–1998), German-American painter
Grete Šadeiko (born 1993), Estonian heptathlete
Grete Salomonsen, Norwegian film director
Grete Treier (born 1977), Estonian road bicycle racer
Grete Waitz (1953–2011), Norwegian marathon runner
Grete Zimmer, birth name of Greta Zimmer Friedman (1924-2016), Austrian-born American nurse kissed by a sailor celebrating the end of World War II in an iconic photograph

Middle name
 Anne Grete Holmsgaard (born 1948), Danish energy expert and politician

Nickname
Margarete Adler (1896–1990), Austrian swimmer
Grete Heublein (1908–1997), German shot putter, discus thrower and sprinter
Grete Mosheim (1905–1986), German actress
Grete Prytz Kittelsen (1917–2010), Norwegian goldsmith, enamel artist, and designer
Grete Rosenberg (1896–1979), German freestyle swimmer
Grete Sultan (1906–2005), German-American pianist

Fictional characters 
Grete Minde, main character of the 1977 Austrian-German drama film Grete Minde, portrayed by Katerina Jacob
Grete Samsa, in Franz Kafka's novella The Metamorphosis

See also
Crete (disambiguation)
Greta (disambiguation)
Gretel (disambiguation)

Feminine given names
Danish feminine given names
Estonian feminine given names
Finnish feminine given names
German feminine given names
Given names derived from gemstones
Icelandic feminine given names
Norwegian feminine given names
Scandinavian feminine given names
Swedish feminine given names
Swiss feminine given names
Hypocorisms